Gentile Valley is a valley in the U.S. state of Idaho.

Gentile Valley was named out of anti-Mormon prejudice. Non-Mormons were commonly called gentiles, and with the name the early settlers of Gentile Valley let it be known that Mormons were not welcome there.

References

Landforms of Caribou County, Idaho
Landforms of Franklin County, Idaho
Valleys of Idaho
Religious discrimination in the United States